Šiška Sports Park is a multi-purpose sports venue in Ljubljana. The venue includes a main football stadium with outdoor track and field, an athletics hall, two football fields with artificial turf, and tennis courts. The main football stadium is commonly named ŽAK Stadium and was used for matches in the Slovenian PrvaLiga by NK Ljubljana, NK Interblock and NK Olimpija Ljubljana. Currently, the stadium is used by NK Bravo and ŠD NK Ljubljana.

The stadium has a capacity of 2,308 seats and was built in 1930. It is owned by the City of Ljubljana. Previously, it was operated by the Railway Sports Association Ljubljana.

Slovenia national team matches

See also
List of football stadiums in Slovenia

References

External links

Official website 

Football venues in Slovenia
Multi-purpose stadiums in Slovenia
Sports venues in Ljubljana
Sports venues completed in 1930
NK Ljubljana
1930 establishments in Slovenia
Athletics (track and field) venues in Slovenia
20th-century architecture in Slovenia